A list of films produced in Italy in 1923 (see 1923 in film):

See also
List of Italian films of 1922
List of Italian films of 1924

External links
 Italian films of 1923 at the Internet Movie Database

Italian
1923
Films